Loose Booty may refer to:

"Loose Booty", a song by Funkadelic from the 1972 album America Eats Its Young
"Loose Booty", a song by Sly and the Family Stone from the 1974 album Small Talk (Sly and the Family Stone album)
"Loose Booty", a song by Faster Pussycat from the 1992 album Whipped!